Rev. Francis Dane (20 November 1615 – 17 February 1697) was baptized in Bishop's Stortford, England, and was probably born there.

Education and early career
Francis Dane matriculated as a sizar at King's College, Cambridge in Easter term 1633 and emigrated to Massachusetts with his parents, John and Frances (née Bowyer) Dane, in 1636. Dane became the second pastor of the North Parish Andover, Massachusetts in 1649. During that time, he founded a school for Andover youth.

Family
By his first wife, Elizabeth Ingalls (1618-1676), Francis had six children, two sons and four daughters: 

 Elizabeth Dane Johnson (1641-1722),
 Nathaniel Dane (1645-1725),
 Hannah Dane Goodhue (1648-1712),
 Phebe Dane Robinson (1650-1726),
 Abigail Dane Faulkner (1652-1730),
 Francis Dane (1656-1738).

He married twice more. His second wife was Mary Thomas (m. 1677-1689; her death), and his third wife was Hannah Abbot (m. 1690-1697; his death).

First Murmurings of Witchcraft
In 1658 when the subject of witchcraft first came to his attention, he came down decidedly against the concept. When John Godfrey was charged with injuring the wife of Job Tyler by "Satanic acts", Dane judged against the probability.

A New Minister

Around 1680, when Francis Dane was about sixty-five years of age, church members became concerned about his ability to fulfill his role leading the church and requested that a younger minister be sent to them. In January 1682, Rev. Thomas Barnard, a recent graduate of Harvard, arrived. Shortly following Barnard's arrival, Francis Dane's salary was stopped. Dane petitioned the General Court in Boston to have it reinstated. The town complied, but split the salary of 80 pounds a year so that Dane received thirty pounds and Barnard received fifty. Neither man was pleased with the solution.

Salem Witch Trials

Dane had lived in Andover for 44 years, and was 76 years old when the Salem Witch Trials began. On October 18, 1692, Dane, Thomas Barnard, and twenty-three others wrote a letter to the governor and to the General Court publicly condemning the witch trials.

Dane and his family were in danger as half a dozen family members stood accused, including Francis Dane himself. Another minister, George Burroughs, had been hanged, and thus Dane's status did not guarantee protection. He warned that his people were guilty of blood for accepting unfounded accusations against covenanted members of the church. Two of Francis Dane's daughters, Elizabeth Dane Johnson and Abigail Dane Faulkner, and his daughter-in-law, Deliverance Dane, were all arrested. Abigail Dane Faulkner's two daughters, Abigail Faulkner (Lamson) and Dorothy Faulkner (Nurse), were also accused of witchcraft. All of these survived the trials.

Trials' influence on family
Dane's daughter, Abigail Faulkner Sr., was convicted and condemned in September 1692 but given a temporary stay of execution because she was pregnant. She was later pardoned by the governor and released. Although Dane's extended family had the most accused of any family, none of his immediate family members was executed, except Elizabeth Jackson Howe (executed July 19, 1692), wife of James Howe, Jr. (or How). Martha Carrier, Dane's niece, was also executed as a witch August 19, 1692.

References

External links
 Pathway: A Family History, Sinners in Salem
 Rev. Francis Dane
 Facsimile of the letter of October 18 1692
 The Founding of Harvard College by Samuel Eliot Morison
 First Church in Andover Massachusetts

1615 births
1697 deaths
17th-century Christian clergy
American Christian clergy
Critics of witch hunting
Massachusetts colonial-era clergy
Kingdom of England emigrants to Massachusetts Bay Colony
People from Bishop's Stortford
People of the Salem witch trials